The 1920 Boston Red Sox season was the 20th season in the franchise's Major League Baseball history. The Red Sox finished fifth in the American League (AL) with a record of 72 wins and 81 losses,  games behind the Cleveland Indians, who went on to win the 1920 World Series.

Offseason 
On January 5, 1920, news that the Red Sox sold their star pitcher-turned-outfielder Babe Ruth to the Yankees for $125,000 became public, the sub-headline in The New York Times the next day read, "Highest Purchase Price in Baseball History Paid for Game's Greatest Slugger." The trade to the Yankees would live in infamy for generations of Boston fans for nearly 85 years and was one of the worse highlights of that offseason.

Regular season

Season standings

Record vs. opponents

Opening Day lineup

Roster

Player stats

Batting

Starters by position 
Note: Pos = Position; G = Games played; AB = At bats; H = Hits; Avg. = Batting average; HR = Home runs; RBI = Runs batted in

Other batters 
Note: G = Games played; AB = At bats; H = Hits; Avg. = Batting average; HR = Home runs; RBI = Runs batted in

Pitching

Starting pitchers 
Note: G = Games pitched; IP = Innings pitched; W = Wins; L = Losses; ERA = Earned run average; SO = Strikeouts

Other pitchers 
Note: G = Games pitched; IP = Innings pitched; W = Wins; L = Losses; ERA = Earned run average; SO = Strikeouts

Relief pitchers 
Note: G = Games pitched; W = Wins; L = Losses; SV = Saves; ERA = Earned run average; SO = Strikeouts

References

External links
1920 Boston Red Sox team page at Baseball Reference
1920 Boston Red Sox season at baseball-almanac.com

Boston Red Sox seasons
Boston Red Sox
Boston Red Sox
1920s in Boston